In real analysis and complex analysis, branches of mathematics, the identity theorem for analytic functions states: given functions f and g analytic on a domain D (open and connected subset of  or ), if f = g on some , where  has an accumulation point, then f = g on D. 

Thus an analytic function is completely determined by its values on a single open neighborhood in D, or even a countable subset of D (provided this contains a converging sequence). This is not true in general for real-differentiable functions, even infinitely real-differentiable functions. In comparison, analytic functions are a much more rigid notion. Informally, one sometimes summarizes the theorem by saying analytic functions are "hard" (as opposed to, say, continuous functions which are "soft").

The underpinning fact from which the theorem is established is the expandability of a holomorphic function into its Taylor series.

The connectedness assumption on the domain D is necessary.

Lemma 

To prove this, it is enough to show that  for all . 

By holomorphy, we have the following Taylor series representation in some open neighborhood U of :

But then  on the punctured set .

This lemma shows that for a complex number , the fiber   is a discrete (and therefore countable) set, unless .

Proof 

We'll show  is nonempty, open, and closed.

So  is open.

This means that  is closed for all .  is an intersection of closed sets, so it's closed.

Full characterisation 

Since the Identity Theorem is concerned with the equality of two holomorphic functions, we can simply consider the difference (which remains holomorphic) and can simply characterise when a holomorphic function is identically . The following result can be found in.

Claim 
Let  denote a non-empty, connected open subset of the complex plane.
For  the following are equivalent.

 the set  contains an accumulation point, ;
 the set  is non-empty, where .

Proof 

The directions (1  2) and (1  3) hold trivially.

For (3  1), by connectedness of  it suffices to prove that the non-empty subset, is clopen (since a topological space is connected if and only if it has no proper clopen subsets).
Since holomorphic functions are infinitely differentiable, i.e. , it is clear that  is closed.

Towards (2  3), fix an accumulation point .
We now prove directly by induction that  for each .
Then for  manipulation of the power series expansion yields

it follows that , whence .
Via induction the claim holds.
Q.E.D.

See also 
Analytic continuation
Identity theorem for Riemann surfaces

References

 

Theorems_in_real_analysis
Theorems in complex analysis
Articles containing proofs